Merit–Tandy Farmstead, also known as the Tandy-Tillotson House, is a historic home and farm located in Posey Township, Switzerland County, Indiana. The house is situated on a hill overlooking the Ohio River. It was built about 1845, and is a one-story, five bay, Federal style square brick dwelling.  Also on the property are the contributing ice house (c. 1845), a large wooden barn, and well house.

It was listed on the National Register of Historic Places in 1977.

References

Farms on the National Register of Historic Places in Indiana
Houses on the National Register of Historic Places in Indiana
Federal architecture in Indiana
Houses completed in 1845
Buildings and structures in Switzerland County, Indiana
National Register of Historic Places in Switzerland County, Indiana